High Sierra is a 1941 American film noir directed by Raoul Walsh, written by William R. Burnett and John Huston from the novel by Burnett, and starring Ida Lupino and Humphrey Bogart. Its plot follows a career criminal who becomes involved in a jewel heist in a resort town in California's Sierra Nevada, along with a young former taxi dancer (Lupino).

Parts of the film were shot on location at Whitney Portal, halfway up Mount Whitney.

The screenplay was co-written by John Huston, Bogart's friend and drinking partner, adapted from the novel by William R. Burnett (also known for, among others, Little Caesar and Scarface). The film cemented a strong personal and professional connection between Bogart and Huston, and provided the breakthrough in Bogart's career, transforming him from supporting player to leading man. The film's success also led to a breakthrough for Huston, providing him with the leverage he needed to make the transition from screenwriter to director, which he made later that year with his adaptation of The Maltese Falcon (1941), starring Bogart.

The film contains extensive location shooting, especially in the climactic final scenes, as the authorities pursue Bogart's character, gangster "Mad Dog" Roy Earle, from Lone Pine to the foot of the mountain.

Plot
An aging gangster, Big Mac, is planning a robbery at a fashionable resort hotel in the resort town of Tropico Springs in the Sierra Nevada. He wants the heist led by convicted bank robber Roy Earle, whose recent release from an Indiana prison was the result of Big Mac's bribing the governor. Roy drives cross-country to an abandoned logging camp in the mountains to meet with the three men who will assist him in the heist: Louis Mendoza, who works as a clerk in the hotel, Red, and Babe, who are already living at the camp. Babe has brought along his girlfriend Marie Garson, a dance hall performer from Los Angeles.

Deriding Marie's involvement, Roy insists she return to her home in San Francisco, but after an argument, he agrees to her staying. At the camp, Algernon, a handyman, introduces Roy to Pard, a small dog to whom he takes a liking. Roy decides to adopt the dog. Meanwhile, Marie falls in love with Roy, but he does not reciprocate. In Tropico Springs, Roy witnesses a minor car accident involving Ma and Pa Goodhue and their granddaughter Velma, a young woman with a clubfoot who walks with a limp. Swiftly enamored with Velma, Roy pays for corrective surgery to allow her to walk normally, despite her grandfather's warning that Velma is engaged. While she is recovering, Roy asks Velma to marry him, but she refuses, explaining that she is devoted to her fiancé, Lon.

The group execute the heist at the hotel, but it goes awry when they are interrupted by a security guard. Roy makes his getaway with Marie, but Mendoza, Red, and Babe are involved in a car crash in which Red and Babe die. Mendoza is captured, and the police question him. Roy and Marie drive to Los Angeles with the jewels, only to find that Big Mac has died of a heart attack and that Jake Kranmer, an ex-policeman, has taken over the operation. Kranmer tries to force Roy to give him the jewels, but a defiant Roy shoots him dead.

Back in Tropico Springs, Roy visits Velma, having promised her he would come to see her able to walk. He then meets with a fence who is to exchange money for the stolen jewels, but the man tells Roy he cannot pay him the $30,000 immediately. While the "fence" looks after the jewels, Roy and Marie go into hiding at a hotel, but they panic when Roy's name and face make newspaper headlines, along with mentions of Marie and their dog, Pard.

Deciding that he would be safer on his own, Roy sends Marie to Las Vegas by bus. He returns to Los Angeles to exchange the jewels. Figuring on collecting immediately, he had given all his ready cash to Marie. When his car runs low on gas, Roy risks a small town stickup and is immediately recognized.  Roy is pursued by police back into the mountains, where he is forced to abandon his car and flee on foot. Marie hears a news broadcast about the chase. She is subsequently interrogated by investigators, who try to persuade her to lure Roy out of hiding. She refuses, however, aware that Roy would rather die than return to prison. Regardless, she is forced to accompany the authorities on their search in the mountains. Meanwhile, Roy hides out behind a large rock on the mountainside.

At dawn, Pard escapes the police encampment and runs to locates Roy, who is suddenly distracted by the dog's barking. Assuming Marie has found him, Roy runs out onto a precipice, calling her name, only to be killed by a sharpshooter. Marie watches in horror from below as Roy's body topples down the mountain peak. Followed by officers, Marie rushes to Roy's body, as does Pard, who lies down next to him. As Marie is escorted away with Pard, she takes small comfort in knowing that Roy will not have to again face prison. She wanted to know what it meant for a guy to crash out, which is what Roy talked about. She asked Healy what it meant, and he said it meant to be free. Marie smiled, knowing that Roy was free of his troubles.

Cast

 Ida Lupino as Marie Garson
 Humphrey Bogart as Roy "Mad Dog" Earle/Roy Collins
 Alan Curtis as Babe Kozak
 Arthur Kennedy as Red Hattery
 Joan Leslie as Velma
 Henry Hull as Doc Banton
 Henry Travers as Pa Goodhue
 Jerome Cowan as Healy
 Minna Gombell as Mrs. Baughman
 Barton MacLane as Jake Kranmer
 Donald MacBride as Big Mac
 Willie Best as Algernon
 Zero as Pard
 Elisabeth Risdon as Ma Goodhue
 Cornel Wilde as Louis Mendoza
 Paul Harvey as Mr. Baughman
 Isabel Jewell as Blonde
 Spencer Charters as Ed
 George Meeker as Pfiffer
 Robert Strange as Art
 John Eldredge as Lon Preiser
 Sam Hayes as Announcer
 Eddie Acuff as Bus Driver

Themes
Luke Goodsell, writing for Senses of Cinema, writes that High Sierra presents its heist narrative as "something of a grasp for the fabled new America. Here, the Old West has been replaced by health spas and diets and a clean-living California; not coincidentally, a land that flourished in tandem with the aspirational illusion of Hollywood."

Production
George Raft was intended to play Roy Earle, but Bogart, who took a great interest in playing the role, managed to talk Raft out of accepting it. Walsh tried to persuade Raft otherwise but Raft did not want to die at the end. Filmink said Raft "turned down High Sierra because it was another gangster  part, despite the excellent source material and Raoul Walsh directing (admittedly Paul Muni rejected the role first for the same reason… but Muni was a proper actor, well established in a variety of parts and Raft wasn’t)."

Bogart had to persuade director Walsh to hire him for the role because Walsh envisioned Bogart as a supporting player rather than a leading man.

Pard, the dog of Bogart's character erroneously was believed by some to be canine actor Terry (Toto from The Wizard of Oz). In the final scene, Buster Wiles, a stunt performer, plays Roy's corpse. His hand is filled with biscuits to encourage Pard to lick Roy's hand.

Many key shots of the movie were filmed on location in the Sierra Nevada. In a climactic scene, Bogart's character slid  down a mountainside to his just reward. His stunt double, Wiles, bounced a few times going down the mountain and wanted another take to do better. "Forget it," said Raoul Walsh. "It's good enough for the 25-cent customers." Special effects were handled by Byron Haskin.

Release

Box office
High Sierra opened theatrically in Los Angeles on January 23, 1941. According to Warner Bros. records, the film made $1,063,000 in the U.S. ($ million in  terms) and $426,000 ($ million in  terms) in other markets.

Critical response
Critic Bosley Crowther liked the acting in the picture, and wrote "As gangster pictures go, this one has everything—speed, excitement, suspense, and that ennobling suggestion of futility, which makes for irony and pity. Mr. Bogart plays the leading role with a perfection of hard-boiled vitality, and Ida Lupino, Arthur Kennedy, Alan Curtis, and a newcomer named Joan Leslie handle lesser roles effectively. Especially, is Miss Lupino impressive as the adoring moll. As gangster pictures go—if they do—it's a perfect epilogue. Count on the old guard and Warners: they die but never surrender."

Time reviewed the film when released as having "less of realistic savagery than of the quaint, nostalgic atmosphere of costume drama." The reviewer noted, "What makes High Sierra something more than a Grade B melodrama is its sensitive delineation of gangster Earle's character. Superbly played by Actor Bogart, Earle is a complex human being, a farmer boy who turned mobster, a gunman with a string of murders on his record who still is shocked when newsmen call him "Mad-Dog" Earle. He is kind to the mongrel dog (Zero) that travels with him, befriends a taxi dancer (Ida Lupino) who becomes his moll, and goes out of his way to help a crippled girl (Joan Leslie). All Roy Earle wants is freedom. He finds it for good on a lonely peak in the mountains."

Rotten Tomatoes gives the film a critic score of 91%, based on 22 reviews.

Home media
Warner Home Video released High Sierra on DVD in November 2003. On October 12, 2021, The Criterion Collection released a new edition of the film on Blu-ray and DVD.

Adaptations
 A radio play on two broadcasts of The Screen Guild Theater, first on January 4, 1942, with Humphrey Bogart and Claire Trevor, and the second on April 17, 1944, with Bogart and Ida Lupino
 The Western Colorado Territory (1949), starring Joel McCrea and Virginia Mayo, and also directed by Raoul Walsh
 I Died a Thousand Times (1955), starring Jack Palance and Shelley Winters, directed by Stuart Heisler

See also 
 Joshua Tree

References

Sources

External links

Streaming audio
 High Sierra on Screen Guild Theater: April 17, 1944

1941 films
1941 crime drama films
American black-and-white films
American crime drama films
American heist films
1940s English-language films
Film noir
Films about organized crime in the United States
Films based on American novels
Films based on crime novels
Films based on works by W. R. Burnett
Films directed by Raoul Walsh
Films scored by Adolph Deutsch
Films set in Palm Springs, California
Films shot in California
Films with screenplays by John Huston
Warner Bros. films
1940s American films